Podalia pedacia is a moth of the family Megalopygidae. It was described by Herbert Druce in 1906.

References

Moths described in 1906
Megalopygidae